(181708) 1993 FW was the second trans-Neptunian object to be discovered after Pluto and Charon, the first having been 15760 Albion, formerly known as . It was discovered in 1993 by David C. Jewitt and Jane X. Luu at the Mauna Kea Observatory, Hawaii. Following its discovery it was nicknamed "Karla" after a character by John le Carré by its discoverers and was hailed as that of a new planet. Mike Brown lists it as possibly a dwarf planet on his website.

181708 was discovered half a year after Albion.

Over one thousand bodies were found in a belt orbiting between about 30-50 AU from the Sun in the twenty years (1992-2012), after finding 1992 QB1 (named in 2018, 15760 Albion), showing a vast belt of bodies more than just Pluto and Albion.  By 2018, over 2000 Kuiper belts objects were discovered.

The mid-1990s were time when the new region "came to life", triggering a retrospective at various predictions about various second asteroid or comet belts in the other system.

Three more KBOs found in 1993 are (15788) 1993 SB, (15789) 1993 SC, and (385185) 1993 RO.

See also
15760 Albion
List of trans-Neptunian objects
Kuiper belt

References

External links
 

181708
Discoveries by David C. Jewitt
Discoveries by Jane Luu
19930328